Sericodon is an extinct genus of teleosaurid crocodyliform from the Late Jurassic (Tithonian) of Germany and Switzerland. The genus contains a single species, S. jugleri. Sericodon was placed in 'Clade T' (Aeolodontinae) and was found to be the sister taxon to Bathysuchus, another teleosaurid.

Taxonomy
Sericodon was named for teeth from Late Jurassic deposits in Hanover, Germany, and Solothurn, Switzerland (Reuchenette Formation) by Hermann von Meyer in 1845. The genus was later synonymized with Steneosaurus by Steel (1973), but new work suggests it might be a distinct genus after all.

In 2020 the genus was formally revived. 

This simplified cladogram by Johnson et al. (2020) shows the updated location of Sericodon within Teleosauridae and Aeolodontinae:

See also 

 List of marine reptiles

References 

Thalattosuchians
Prehistoric pseudosuchian genera
Prehistoric marine crocodylomorphs
Late Jurassic crocodylomorphs
Tithonian life
Late Jurassic reptiles of Europe
Fossil taxa described in 1845